Wendy Marina Villón Mercado (born 9 May 1978) is an Ecuadorian football manager and former player, who played as a midfielder. She has been a member of the Ecuador women's national team as both a player and a coach.

International career
Villón played for Ecuador at senior level in two South American Women's Football Championship editions (2003 and 2006).

International goals
Scores and results list Ecuador's goal tally first

Managerial career
Villón managed Ecuador at the 2018 Copa América Femenina and Deportivo Cuenca at the 2019 Copa Libertadores Femenina.

References

1978 births
Living people
Women's association football midfielders
Women's association football managers
Ecuadorian women's footballers
Sportspeople from Guayaquil
Ecuador women's international footballers
Ecuadorian football managers
Female association football managers
C.D. Cuenca managers
Ecuador women's national football team managers
21st-century Ecuadorian women